Bussen Trafikkselskap was a Norwegian bus company that operated the yellow city bus in Kristiansand and surrounding areas Vennesla, Søgne and Songdalen. The company had about 300 employees and operates on contract with Agder Kollektivtrafikk. Nettbuss Sør (blue buses) took over the local buses in Kristiansand 01.01.2011.

History
The company was founded on January 1, 1986 as the result of a merger between Ruteexpressen, Lillesand og Topdalens Bilruter, Torridalens Bilruter and Vaagsbygdruta and is owned by the holding company TK Brøvig that also owns Vaagsbygdruta and Sørlandsruta.

Defunct bus companies of Norway
Bus companies of Agder
Transport companies established in 1986
1986 establishments in Norway